The IJCAI Award for Research Excellence is a biannual award before given at the IJCAI conference to researcher in artificial intelligence as a recognition of excellence of their career. Beginning in 2016, the conference is held annually and so is the award.

Laureates
The recipients of this award have been:

 John McCarthy (1985)
 Allen Newell (1989)
 Marvin Minsky (1991)
 Raymond Reiter (1993)
 Herbert A. Simon (1995)
 Aravind Joshi (1997)
 Judea Pearl (1999)
 Donald Michie (2001)
 Nils Nilsson (2003)
 Geoffrey E. Hinton (2005)
 Alan Bundy (2007)
 Victor R. Lesser (2009)
 Robert Kowalski (2011)
 Hector Levesque (2013)
 Barbara Grosz (2015)
 for her pioneering research in Natural Language Processing and in theories and applications of Multiagent Collaboration. 
 Michael I. Jordan (2016)
 for his groundbreaking and impactful research in both the theory and application of statistical machine learning. 
 Andrew Barto (2017)
 for his pioneering work in the theory of reinforcement learning.

Winners of also Turing Award
 John McCarthy (1971)
 Allen Newell (1975)
 Marvin Minsky (1969)
 Herbert A. Simon (1975)
 Judea Pearl (2011)
 Geoffrey Hinton (2018)

See also 

 List of computer science awards
 Turing Award

References

External links
http://www.ijcai.org/awards/

Computer science awards